Ozyornoye is a rural locality (a selo) in Starodubsky District, Bryansk Oblast, Russia. The population was 19 as of 2010. There are 4 streets.

Geography 
Ozyornoye is located 19 km south of Starodub (the district's administrative centre) by road. Privalovka and Novomlynka are the nearest rural localities.

References 

Rural localities in Starodubsky District